Chevallier is a French surname. The word originated during the Middle Ages when it denoted a knight. There are multiple variations of this name, including Chevalier. Notable people with the surname include:

Alain Chevallier (c. 1948–2016), French motorcycle designer and brother of Olivier Chevallier
 Claire Chevallier (born 1969), Franco-Belgian classical pianist
Gabriel Chevallier (1895–1969), French novelist
Jean-Baptiste-Alphonse Chevallier (1793-1879), French pharmacist-chemist
Jean-Jacques Chevallier (1900–1983), French historian
John Barrington Chevallier (1857–1940), British schoolmaster who played in four FA Cup finals, on the winning team in 1879 and 1882
Olivier Chevallier (1949–1980), French Grand Prix motorcycle racer
Temple Chevallier (1794–1873), British professor of mathematics and astronomy

Chevalliers of Aspall Hall, a family resident at Aspall, Suffolk, producers of Aspall Cyder

See also
Chevallier (crater), Moon crater named after Temple Chevallier
Chevallier family tree

French-language surnames